The Division of La Trobe is an Australian Electoral Division in the state of Victoria. It is a semi-urban electorate extending from the outer south-eastern suburbs of Melbourne to the westernmost areas of Gippsland. It fully incorporates the suburbs of Beaconsfield, Officer and Pakenham, the majority of Clyde North and Harkaway, and eastern portions of Berwick. The division also covers towns beyond the metropolitan area such as Beaconsfield Upper, Bunyip, Cockatoo, Emerald, Garfield, Gembrook, Koo Wee Rup, Lang Lang, Nar Nar Goon and Pakenham Upper.

Geography
Since 1984, federal electoral division boundaries in Australia have been determined at redistributions by a redistribution committee appointed by the Australian Electoral Commission. Redistributions occur for the boundaries of divisions in a particular state, and they occur every seven years, or sooner if a state's representation entitlement changes or when divisions of a state are malapportioned.

History

The division was proclaimed at the redistribution of 11 May 1949, and was first contested at the 1949 election. It was named after Charles La Trobe, the first Lieutenant-Governor of Victoria. It was originally located closer to the city, but redistributions moved it further south-east. It originally included the suburbs of Croydon, Dandenong, Ferntree Gully and Ringwood.

The first person to hold the seat was Richard Casey, Baron Casey, later the sixteenth Governor-General of Australia and the last of three Australian politicians to be elevated to the British House of Lords. The Division of Casey, which borders this Division to the north, is named after him. In 1961, the division was the subject of a book, Parties and People: A Survey Based on the La Trobe Electorate, by Creighton Burns.

Members

Election results

References

External links
 Division of La Trobe - Australian Electoral Commission

Electoral divisions of Australia
Constituencies established in 1949
1949 establishments in Australia
Shire of Cardinia
City of Casey
Yarra Ranges